St Peter's Church is located in the village of Henley near Ipswich. It is an active Anglican parish church in the deanery of Bosmere, part of the archdeaconry of Ipswich, and the Diocese of St Edmundsbury and Ipswich.

History 

The Church is a Grade 1 listed building in the village of Henley.

The building includes features dating from the 13th century such as the south door of the church through to more modern work including a nineteenth century addition of a parish room.

The tower contains a ring of eight bells dating from between 1480 and 1902. In 1972 the frames were renovated and the bells rehung. An additional bell for the clock on the tower was installed in 1976 previously having been held in a church at Ubbeston.

See also 
Grade I listed buildings in Suffolk

References 

Church of England church buildings in Suffolk
Grade I listed churches in Suffolk
Mid Suffolk District